In Major League Baseball (MLB), the 500 home run club is a group of batters who have hit 500 or more regular-season home runs in their careers. On August 11, 1929, Babe Ruth became the first member of the club. Ruth ended his career with 714 home runs, a record which stood from 1935 until Hank Aaron surpassed it in 1974. Aaron's ultimate career total, 755, remained the record until Barry Bonds set the current mark of 762 during the 2007 season. Twenty-eight players are members of the 500 home run club. Ted Williams (.344) holds the highest batting average among the club members while Harmon Killebrew (.256) holds the lowest.

Of these 28 players, 15 were right-handed batters, 11 were left-handed, and 2 were switch hitters. The San Francisco Giants and Boston Red Sox are the only franchises to see four players reach the milestone while on their roster: for the Giants, Mel Ott while the team was in New York, Willie Mays, Willie McCovey, and most recently Bonds, and, for the Red Sox, Jimmie Foxx, Williams, and more recently Manny Ramirez and David Ortiz. Seven 500 home run club members—Aaron, Mays, Eddie Murray, Rafael Palmeiro, Albert Pujols, Alex Rodriguez and Miguel Cabrera—are also members of the 3,000 hit club. Gary Sheffield's 500th home run was his first career home run with the New York Mets, the first time that a player's 500th home run was also his first with his franchise. Rodriguez, at 32 years and 8 days, was the youngest player to reach the milestone while Williams, at 41 years and 291 days, was the oldest. The most recent player to reach 500 home runs is Miguel Cabrera, who hit his 500th home run on August 22, 2021; Cabrera is also the only active member of the club. Six members of the club were born outside of the United States: Sammy Sosa, Ramirez, Pujols and Ortiz in the Dominican Republic; Palmeiro in Cuba, and Cabrera in Venezuela.

Membership in the 500 home run club is sometimes described as a guarantee of eventual entry into the Baseball Hall of Fame, although some believe the milestone has become less meaningful in recent years. Seven eligible club members—Bonds, Rodriguez, Mark McGwire, Palmeiro, Ramirez, Sheffield and Sosa—have not been elected to the Hall. Eligibility requires that a player has "been retired five seasons" or be deceased for at least six months. Some believe the milestone has become less important with the large number of new members; 10 players joined the club from 1999 to 2009. Additionally, several of these recent members - including all seven aforementioned eligible members - have had ties to performance-enhancing drugs. Some believe that by not electing McGwire to the Hall the voters were establishing a "referendum" on how they would treat players from the "Steroid Era". On January 8, 2014, Palmeiro became the first member of the club to be removed from the BBWAA Hall of Fame ballot after failing to appear on at least 5.0% of ballots.

Key

Members
Stats updated as of the end of the 2022 season.

See also

Ted Williams Museum and Hitters Hall of Fame, includes a "500 Homerun Club" exhibit
List of Major League Baseball career home run leaders
3,000 hit club

References
General

Specific

Major League Baseball statistics
Home run leaders, lifetime 500